Daugherty is an populated place in central Cass County, in the U.S. state of Missouri. The community is on Missouri Route 7 five miles southeast of Harrisonville and approximately 5.5 miles northwest of Garden City. The site is at an elevation of 892 feet and just west of Eight Mile Creek.

History
Daugherty was platted in 1885, and named after James Daugherty, one of the founders. A variant name was "Eight Mile". A post office called Eight Mile was established in 1877, and remained in operation until 1935.

References

Unincorporated communities in Cass County, Missouri
Unincorporated communities in Missouri